The Natal free-tailed bat (Mormopterus acetabulosus) is a species of bat in the family Molossidae, the free-tailed bats. It is endemic to the island of Mauritius. It is known from fewer than five locations in its range, but it is common at a few sites. It roosts in caves, and it is considered to be an endangered species due to disturbance of its cave habitat.

Taxonomy and etymology
It was described as a new species in 1804 by French naturalist Johann Hermann. Hermann placed it in the genus Vespertilio. In 2008, the Natal free-tailed bat was split into two taxa with the description of a new species, Mormopterus francoismoutoui. The species is called the "Natal" free-tailed bat because of another species Hermann described, Dysopes natalensis, named after the Natal Province of South Africa. 

Dysopes natalensis was later synonymized with the Natal free-tailed bat. Its species name "acetabulosus" is Latin for saucer-shaped.

Description
The Natal free-tailed bat is a very small species of bat. Its upper lip is very wrinkled. Its ears are small and connected in the back by a thin interaural membrane. Males have a sebaceous gland, as with some other free-tailed bats, but they do not have an interaural crest.

Range and habitat
It is endemic to Mauritius. There is one "doubtful" record from Madagascar and two records from South Africa which may be vagrants.

Conservation
As of 2017, it is listed as endangered by the IUCN. From 1999–2017, its population likely declined by more than 80%. Its caves are being disturbed for tourism.

References

Mormopterus
Mammals described in 1804
Bats of Africa
Mammals of Mauritius
Mammals of Réunion
Taxa named by Johann Hermann